Sukhbir Singh Jaunapuria is an Indian politician and owner of a Gurugram-based real estate group. He is currently a member of parliament after winning the 2014 and 2019 Lok Sabha election from Tonk-Sawai Madhopur in Rajasthan as a candidate of the Bharatiya Janata Party. He defeated former member of parliament and former Indian cricket team captain Mohammad Azharuddin by a margin of 1,48,000  votes. In the recent 2019 Lok Sabha elections, he won by defeating ex-cabinet minister Namo Narayan Meena by 1,1100 votes. He was a former independent member of the Haryana Legislative Assembly in the Sohna Vidhan Sabha Constituency from 2004 to 2009. He won the Sohna seat independently by defeating political stars of the Congress Party and others.

References

1957 births
Living people
Indian Hindus
India MPs 2014–2019
India MPs 2019–present
Members of the Haryana Legislative Assembly
Lok Sabha members from Rajasthan
People from Sawai Madhopur district
Bharatiya Janata Party politicians from Haryana
Bharatiya Janata Party politicians from Rajasthan